Ratris Khel Chale 2 is a Marathi supernatural thriller drama serial which aired on Zee Marathi from 14 January 2019 serving as a prequel to the series Ratris Khel Chale.

Series

Plot 
The second season is the prequel to the first season. It shows the Naik family's mysterious past, which led to Anna Naik's untimely death and the strange occurrences. It revolves around Anna's middle age, when he is an influential person in the village who uses power to take undue advantage of the village folk as well as kill people at times. This all leads to strange events happening in the house, including him witnessing ghosts of the people he murders.

Anna forcefully removes his elder brother Aaba's family from their house to control all the family property. He also becomes intimate with Kumudini "Shevanta" Patankar, who newly moves into the village with her husband Kamalakar Patankar. She gives birth to her and Anna's daughter Sushma. Anna also kills many villagers to usurp their properties. Soon, strange events starts to happen in the house, as a result of the ghosts of the people killed by Anna, and Anna witnesses the ghosts sometimes. Years later, after killing Kamalakar, Anna builds a house for Shevanta. But she gets more possessive with Anna. He then tricks her into committing suicide on the tree of the Naik house and the tree gets haunted. Finally, years later, Anna mends his way and gets on the right path. But his crime-filled past inflicts curses upon him and he faces untimely death by getting killed by all the ghosts.

Cast

Main
 Madhav Abhyankar as Hari "Anna" Naik, the influential person in the village. Shevanta and Indumati's husband.
 Shakuntala Nare as Indumati "Mai" Naik, Anna's kind-hearted wife.
 Apurva Nemlekar as Kumudini "Shevanta" Kamalakar Patankar, one of the women Anna was obsessed with. Sushma's mother.
 Sanjeevani Patil as Vatsala "Vachchhi" Aaba Naik, Aaba's wife, who is angry after Anna doesn't share their ancestral wealth with his brother, leaving her family in poverty.

Recurring 
 Suhas Shirsat as Dattaram "Datta" Hari Naik, Anna's second son from Bhivari but still raised as Indu's own, the most responsible member of the Naik family after Anna.
 Mangesh Salvi as Madhav Hari Naik, Anna's eldest son who moves to Mumbai for work.
 Prajakta Wadaye as Sarita Dattaram Naik, Datta's wife and the only second generation mistress in the house to take care of it.
 Namrata Pavaskar as Chhaya Hari Naik, Anna's third child and only daughter, whose husband died on the night of their wedding, leaving her widowed and to live in her parents' home.
 Sainkeet Kamat as Abhiram Hari Naik, Anna's youngest son who is sent to Mumbai for studies at boarding school.
 Dilip Bapat as Advocate Nene, who always saved Anna after he had committed any crime and helped him acquire properties.
 Anil Gawde as Raghunath "Raghu" Gurav, who is the Gurav of the village, who is often called by the Naiks whenever any paranormal event occurs.
 Pralhad Kudtarkar as Pandu, a man cared for by the Naiks who forgets almost everything he hears or sees.
 Diksha Sonawane as Bhivari, a mistress of Anna Naik, Dattaram's biological mother.
 Abhay Khadapkar as Aaba Naik, Vachchhi's husband, Kashi's father, Anna's elder brother.
 Sachin Shirke as Kashinath "Kashi" Aaba Naik, Aaba and Vachchhi's only child, Shobha's husband, who becomes mentally unstable.
 Mangal Rane as Shobha Kashinath Naik, Aaba and Vachchhi's daughter-in-law, Kashi's wife, who is almost as cunning as her vengeful mother-in-law.
 Adish Paigude as Kamalakar Patankar, Shevanta's generous and modest husband. His low income causes Shevanta to have extramarital affairs with Anna for money.
 Hridaynath Jadhav as Chontya, a villager who occasionally does work for Anna in exchange for money.

Production

Development 
The production and filming of series took place in Akeri, Maharashtra in Konkan Region. The filming of Season 2 was stopped on 27 March 2020 due to COVID-19 pandemic. But, new episodes of this show were started airing from 13 July 2020. The show went off air in late August and making way for crime series Devmanus.

Casting 
Madhav Abhyankar was selected to play the role of Anna Naik.  

Apurva Nemlekar was selected to play the role of Shevanta. 

Prajakta Wadaye is offered for the role of Sarita who was previously played by Ashwini Mukadam in Ratris Khel Chale.

Shakuntala Nare, Suhas Shirsat, Namrata Pawaskar, Pralhad Kudtarkar, Mangesh Salvi reprising their roles of Mai, Datta, Chhaya, Pandu.

Special episode (1 hour) 
 31 December 2019

Awards

Reception

Ratings

Dubbed version

References

External links 
 
 Ratris Khel Chale 2 at ZEE5

Marathi-language television shows
2010s supernatural television series
Thriller television series
Zee Marathi original programming
2019 Indian television series debuts
2020 Indian television series endings